Jacobus Johannes van Dyk (born 6 July 1994) is a South African rugby union player for the  in Super Rugby. His regular playing positions are number 8, lock or flanker.

Rugby career

Youth and Varsity Cup rugby

Van Dyk was born in Bredasdorp and attended school in Caledon. He never represented his local provincial side  at schoolboy tournaments, such as the Craven Week. However, after enrolling at the Stellenbosch University, he was selected to represent Western Province at Under-21 level, making three appearances for them in the 2014 Under-21 Provincial Championship.

He made seven starts for  during the 2015 Under-21 Provincial Championship regular season, before dropping to the bench for the title play-offs; he came on as a first-half replacement in their 43–20 victory over the s in the semi-finals, but remained unused in the final, in which his side beat the s 52–17.

Western Province

Shortly after the 2016 Varsity Cup, Van Dyk was also included in the  squad for their 2016 Currie Cup qualification series.

References

South African rugby union players
Living people
1994 births
People from Cape Agulhas Local Municipality
Rugby union locks
Rugby union flankers
Rugby union number eights
Stormers players
Western Province (rugby union) players
Yokohama Canon Eagles players
Rugby union players from the Western Cape